Amlaíb Ua Donnubáin (or Olaf/Auliffe O'Donovan) (died 1201) is the last member of the O'Donovan family to be styled king of Uí Chairpre Áebda (Cairbre Eva) in the Irish annals, and in fact the very last known king of this people.

He is the chief victim mentioned by name of a major joint military expedition led by the Anglo-Norman William de Burgh and the three sons of the King of Thomond, Domnall Mór Ua Briain (died 1194), namely Muirchertach, Conchobar Ruad, and Donnchad Cairprech, into Desmond. The Annals of Inisfallen report the events as follows:

Mac Carthaigh's Book reports them slightly differently:

In any case, this was effectively the end of the over two century long feud between the O'Donovans and the O'Brien dynasty, resulting from the eponymous Donnubán mac Cathail's capture in 976 of Mathgamain mac Cennétig, elder brother of the famous Brian Bóruma. This had originated in competition between the Uí Chairpre and the rising Dál gCais over both territory in what is now northeastern County Limerick and northwestern County Tipperary, as well as the trade brought to the region by the Norse of Limerick City.

Notably Amlaíb was presumably slain near Cenn Eich, the modern Castletown-Kinneigh, which is in West County Cork near Ballineen and Enniskean, very near to the later home of the family in Carbery, that region most likely deriving its name, in a complicated manner, from the people of his family. In any case, as the first O'Donovan noted there, he is the one most sensibly given the principal credit for establishing the family outside the ancient domains of the Uí Chairpre Áebda. But because of the generally poor and confused state of the O'Donovan pedigrees nothing else is known of his life for certain, nor even his precise relation to the later lords in Carbery. Crom Ua Donnubáin, common ancestor of the later families in Carbery, and the next noted in the region after Amlaíb, would appear to have been a nephew or at least near relation.

1200
Olaf is in all likelihood the leader of the Uí Chairpri-led alliance in 1200 against Domnall Mór na Curra Mac Carthaig, King of Desmond, reported in the Annals of Inisfallen:

Domnall Mór na Curra was a powerful king and it is obviously notable that he appears to have been badly defeated here by the Uí Chairpri and their supporters, both Gaels and the Norman de Barrys. However, there was clearly some confusion following the conflict because here the king of Desmond is reported slain, while according to another entry he actually died in 1206.

Earlier context

References

 Mac Airt, Seán (ed. & tr.). The Annals of Inisfallen (MS. Rawlinson B. 503). Dublin Institute for Advanced Studies. 1951.
 O'Donovan, John (ed. & tr.), Annála Ríoghachta Éireann. Annals of the Kingdom of Ireland by the Four Masters, from the Earliest Period to the Year 1616. 7 vols. Dublin: Royal Irish Academy. 1848-51. 2nd edition, 1856. Volume III (pp. 126–7, notes), Volume IV (pp. 832–4, notes), Volume VI (Appendix, Pedigree of O'Donovan, pp. 2430–83).
 Ó hInnse, Séamus (ed. & tr.) and Florence MacCarthy, Mac Carthaigh's Book, or Miscellaneous Irish Annals (A.D. 1114-1437). Dublin Institute for Advanced Studies. 1947.
 Ó Murchadha, Diarmuid, Family Names of County Cork. Cork: The Collins Press. 2nd edition, 1996.

12th-century Irish monarchs
Year of birth unknown
1201 deaths
Amlaib
People from County Cork